Xinji South railway station is a railway station of Shiji Passenger Railway located in Xinji, Shijiazhuang, Hebei People's Republic of China.

Railway stations in Hebei
Stations on the Qingdao–Taiyuan High-Speed Railway